Kristin Lewis (born 1975, Little Rock, Arkansas) is a lyrico-spinto soprano, known for her Verdi repertoire. She has performed in many opera houses around the world, and is based in Vienna, where she continued her studies with opera singer Carol Byers.

Awards
She has been awarded:
the "Artist of the Year" award (Savonlinna Opera Festival, 2010)
the "Oscars of the Opera" (Arena di Verona Foundation, 2010)
the "Orazio Tosi Prize" (Club Lirica Parma, 2012)
She is also winner of the:
Internationalen Gesangswettbewerb Ferruccio Tagliavini
Concorso Internazionale Di Musica Gian Battista Viotti
Concorso Internationale di Canto Debutto A Merano (Opera Prize and the Audience Award)

Kristin Lewis Foundation 
In 2014 she created the Kristin Lewis Foundation to support emerging musicians from her home state, Arkansas, with funds for tuition costs, attendance at master classes, and national or international travel.

References

External links 
 http://www.kristinlewis.de/
 http://www.kristinlewisfoundation.com/

1985 births
Sopranos
Living people
21st-century American women opera singers